Serian  is a town, and the capital of the Serian (2,039.9 square kilometres) separated on 11 April 2015 from Samarahan Division, Sarawak, Malaysia. Sub-district headquarters towns are Balai Ringin and Tebedu.

The town is known for its durians, which are popularly believed to be the best in Sarawak. This has prompted the Serian District Council to erect a giant monument to this "king of fruits" right in the middle of the market square. However, other monuments such as the tiger and the buffalo statues seem out of place as there are no tigers or buffalos in this district. The town is well connected to its rich hinterland both by road and by water and thus one can find all sorts of jungle produce available in the jungle produce market but lately, most of these produce were brought in from Kalimantan, Indonesia as the price are cheaper.

The district population (year 2010 census) was 90,763. About 65% of the population are Bidayuh. The other main ethnic groups are Iban, Chinese, and Malay.

Geography
Limestone formations and paddy fields can be seen along the way to Tebedu. Other attraction points of Serian are Gua Tiab Bilanting which is situated at Kampung Pichin and also Bukit Parang which is located at the Sarawak-Kalimantan border.

There are many waterfalls found in Serian District Sarawak. Simuja Waterfall is another waterfall can be found in Serian but it was damaged badly by logging activities. There is no proper road to the waterfall and visitors have to hike  from Serian-Sri Aman trunk road to get there.

Tebakang a small town in located approximately 12 km away from Serian, is a home to Mayang Tea plantation, Sarawak sole tea producer.

Climate
Serian has a tropical rainforest climate (Af) with heavy to very heavy rainfall year-round.

Education
Serian District Education Office (PPD Serian)
Serian Teacher Activity Center (PKG Serian)

Primary school
SK Balai Ringin
SK Bedup
SK Daha
SK Engkeroh
SK Entayan
SK Entubuh
SK Gahat Mawang
SK Gemang
SK Koran
SK Krait
SK Krangan
SK Krusen
SK Kujang Mawang
SK Kujang Sain
SK Lebur/Remun
SK Lobang Batu
SK Lubok Antu Reban
SK Mapu
SK Mawang Taup
SK Melansai
SK Mentu Tapu
SK Merakai
SK Merbau
SK Mubok Berawan
SK Parun Suan
SK Pangkalan Sorah
SK Pati
SK Payau
SK Plaman Baki/Menaul
SK Pridan
SK Rayang
SK Reteh
SK Riih Daso
SK Rituh
SK Samarahan Estate
SK Sangai
SK Sebanban
SK Semada
SK Semukoi
SK Sejijag
SK Serian
SK Sumpas
SK Sungai Kenyah
SK Sungai Rimu
SK Sungai Sameran
SK Sungan
SK Tanah Merah
SK Tanah Puteh
SK Tarat
SK Tebakang
SK Tebedu
SK Tema
SK Temong
SK Tepoi
SK Tesu
SK Tian Murud
SK Triang
SK All Saints Plaman Nyabet
SK ST Alban Ampungan
SK ST Ambrose Panchor
SK ST Anthony Kawan
SK ST Barnabas Baru
SK ST Dominic Pichin
SK ST Henry Slabi
SK ST John Mantung
SK ST John Taee
SK ST Jude Bunan
SK ST Matthew Lanchang
SK ST Michael Mongkos
SK ST Norbert Paon Gahat
SK ST Patrick Tangga
SK ST Philip Bugu
SK ST Raymond Mujat
SK ST Teresa Serian
SJK Chung Hua Serian
SJK Chung Hua Bt. 29
SJK Chung Hua Bt. 35
SJK Chung Hua Bt. 32
SJK Sungai Menyan
SJK Pangkalan Bedup
Sekolah Ayer Manis

Secondary school
SMK Tebakang
SMK Tarat
SMK Taee
SMK Serian
SMK Tebedu
SMK Balai Ringin

Shopping Malls
H&L Supermarket
Everrise (Closed in 2019)
Everwin Supermarket
UNACO Supermarket
Jun Rong
Pasar Raya Sin Joon Miaw
Le Papa Hypermarket

Transport

Local Bus

Local Bus or Bus Express remain unclear

Administration

Members of Parliament

Other Information
Serian town is one of the busiest towns, especially during festive seasons. Stores and shops are packed by mainly Bidayuh people returning home from Peninsular Malaysia, abroad or major towns on Gawai and Christmas holidays.

References

External links

 Official web page of Serian District Council